Presence and Instant Messaging (PRIM) was an early proposal to the IETF of a standard protocol for instant messaging. 

The abstract model was first published as an IETF Request for Comments, RFC 2778 "A Model for Presence and Instant Messaging" in February 2000, which was authored by Mark Day of SightPath (formerly of Lotus Software where helped develop IBM Lotus Sametime, now Chief Scientist at Riverbed Technology), Jonathan Rosenberg of dynamicsoft (now the Chief Technology Officer and Vice President of Collaboration at Cisco Systems) and Hiroyasu Sugano of Fujitsu Laboratories LtdLtd.

No work has been done on it since 2001.  Currently, SIP and its derivative SIMPLE (both of which Jonathan Rosenberg also co-authored or invented), and XMPP are being considered for use as instant messaging protocols.

See also
Instant Messaging and Presence Protocol (IMPP)

References

External links
Presence and Instant Messaging Protocol (prim) WG - IETF Datatracker

Instant messaging protocols
Working groups